Nostoc, also known as star jelly, troll’s butter, spit of moon, fallen star, witch's butter (not to be confused with the fungi commonly known as witches' butter), and witch’s jelly, is the most common genus of cyanobacteria found in various environments that may form colonies composed of filaments of moniliform cells in a gelatinous sheath of polysaccharides. Nostoc is a genus of photosynthetic, Gram-negative cyanobacteria that can be found in both terrestrial and aquatic environments. It may also grow symbiotically within the tissues of plants, providing nitrogen to its host through the action of terminally differentiated cells known as heterocysts. Nostoc is a genus that includes many species that are diverse in morphology, habitat distribution, and ecological function. Nostoc can be found in soil, on moist rocks, at the bottom of lakes and springs, and rarely in marine habitats. It may also be found in terrestrial temperate, desert, tropical, or polar environments.  

The name Nostoc was coined by Paracelsus and is a combination of the English nostril and German Nasenloch "nose hole, nostril", likely due to appearance of many species colonies being similar to nasal mucus. When it is on the ground, a Nostoc colony is ordinarily not seen, but after a rain, it swells up into a conspicuous, jellylike mass, which was once thought to have fallen from the sky, hence the popular names, like star jelly, troll’s butter, and witch's butter mentioned above.

Morphology 

Nostoc are a genus of photosynthetic, Gram-negative photosynthetic cyanobacteria. Many species of Nostoc possess an outer layer and extensive inner matrix of polysaccharides, giving them their "jelly-like" or gelatinous appearance, and also help to protect them from their environment and can assist in the absorption of moisture. This allows them to survive stressful conditions such as fluctuating temperatures, drought, salt stress, desiccation, UV radiation, and infection by pathogens. Some species within the genus also have nitrogen-fixing heterocyst filaments enclosed in this membrane. 

Many members of the Nostoc genus form colonies. These colonies can reach several centimeters in diameter. These colonies consist of mats or gelatinous masses created by aggregated trichomes that can appear in a range of colors (depending on the species) such as brown, yellow, or green. 

Additionally, some species of Nostoc are able to enter quiescent stages, further aiding in their survival of adverse conditions, and allowing them to resume metabolism when re-hydrated.

Ecology

Habitat and distribution 
Nostoc can be found in a variety of environments, both terrestrial and aquatic, depending on the species. Their polysaccharide outer layer and matrix allows them to survive and thrive in a variety of conditions and habits ranging from deserts, semideserts, grasslands, polar, and tropical regions depending on the particular species of Nostoc. In terms of aquatic environments, Nostoc has been documented to be naturally found in marine water, fresh water, as well as brackish water.

Interactions with other organisms 
Depending on the species, Nostoc may either be free-living in their environment, or they may form relationships with the other organisms in their environment, such as plants, fungi, or other bacteria. Because Nostoc is able to form colonies on the surface or bare minerals, it is able to provide a more stable environment for higher vegetation in its environment. Some species of Nostoc also form relationships with plants that lack vascular tissue such as Bryophytes because of their ability to fix nitrogen. Nostoc has also been found to form symbiotic associations and other relationships with other bacteria in their environment. Some species of Nostoc that form colonies in freshwater environments provide a habitat to other freshwater bacteria. Additionally, some species like N. commune and N. flageliforme form relationships with heterotrophic bacteria and actinobacteria present in their environments, likely due to the fact that they are a potential significant player in nitrogen cycling in aquatic ecosystems.

Usage

Biotechnological usage 
Nostoc has been documented to produce many compounds of interest, including those that are antiviral, antitumor, antifungal, and antibacterial. 

In addition to the suggested pharmaceutical usage, Nostoc has also been a suggested biofertilizer, and source of fatty acids for biofuel production.

Environmental usage 
Nostoc has the unique ability to survive and colonize new and bare mineral surfaces by moss and other higher plants, which then allows for more organic soil and stable vegetation. It has been suggested that Nostoc be used in environments of retreating glaciers in order to establish new and more stable presences of vegetation on newly exposed mineral surfaces.

Historical and culinary usage 

Nostoc has historically been utilized as a healthy food and traditional medicine, most notably in Asia  Historically, the species N. flagelliforme and N. commune have been consumed in China, where it was used to survive famines and has been used as an ingredient in Chinese medicine since the Eastern Jin Dynasty. Additionally, Nostoc has had documented culinary usage in India, Indonesia, Peru, Bolivia, and Ecuador, too. 

Nostoc is also highly nutritious, containing protein and vitamin C, as well as all essential amino acids. It has been suggested to be anti-inflammatory and an antioxidant as well. Because of this, Nostoc has also been considered to be a strong candidate for extraterrestrial agriculture.

Human impact and management 

Because of human foot traffic, and contaminated gardening tools and irrigation systems, Nostoc is usually found outside of its natural habitat in plant nurseries and greenhouses. A number of different control methods can be effective in removing unwanted Nostoc from these environments, including implementing increased drainage in these facilities, physical removal of Nostoc, and flame weeders or solarization.

Taxonomy

Nostoc is a member of the family Nostocaceae of the order Nostocales. Species include (see collapsed list on the right for full listing) :

Nostoc azollae
Nostoc caeruleum Lyngbye ex Bornet et Flahault
Nostoc carneum
Nostoc comminutum
Nostoc commune (Linnaeus) Vaucher ex Bornet et Flahault (Chinese: Koxianmi)
Nostoc ellipsosporum
Nostoc flagelliforme
Nostoc linckia
Nostoc longstaffi
Nostoc microscopicum (Carmichael ex Harvey) Bornet et Flahault
Nostoc muscorum
Nostoc paludosum
Nostoc pruniforme (Linnaeus) C. A. Agardh ex Bornet et Flahault
Nostoc punctiforme
Nostoc sphaericum
Nostoc sphaeroides
Nostoc spongiaeforme
Nostoc thermotolerans
Nostoc verrucosum Vaucher ex Bornet et Flahault

References

Citations

General sources

Davidson, Alan. Oxford Companion to Food (1999), "Nostoc".

External links 
  Nostoc spec. in lichens
 

Nostocaceae
Cyanobacteria genera